Nazif Kuran (born 20 May 1945) is a Turkish boxer. He competed in the men's middleweight event at the 1972 Summer Olympics.

References

1945 births
Living people
Turkish male boxers
Olympic boxers of Turkey
Boxers at the 1972 Summer Olympics
Place of birth missing (living people)
Mediterranean Games bronze medalists for Turkey
Mediterranean Games medalists in boxing
Competitors at the 1967 Mediterranean Games
Middleweight boxers
20th-century Turkish people